Aegoceropsis is a genus of moths of the family Noctuidae.

Species
 Aegoceropsis affinis Druce, 1883
 Aegoceropsis brevivitta Hampson, 1901
 Aegoceropsis ferrugo Jordan, 1926
 Aegoceropsis fervida Walker, 1854
 Aegoceropsis geometrica Hampson, 1910
 Aegoceropsis obliqua Mabille, 1893
 Aegoceropsis rectilinea Boisduval, 1836
 Aegoceropsis tricolora Bethune-Baker, 1909

References
 Aegoceropsis  at Markku Savela's Lepidoptera and Some Other Life Forms
 Natural History Museum Lepidoptera genus database

Agaristinae
Noctuoidea genera